Félix Armando Golindano Pereira (born 16 November 1969 in Caracas, Venezuela) is a former Venezuelan professional football goalkeeper who played for clubs in Venezuela, Paraguay and China.

Teams
  Trujillanos 1992–1995
  Happy Valley AA 1995–1996
  Estudiantes de Mérida 1997–1999
  12 de Octubre 1999
  Olimpia 1999–2001
  Caracas FC 2002–2004
  Mineros de Guayana 2009

External links
Profile at Footballdatabase

1974 births
Living people
Footballers from Caracas
Venezuelan footballers
Venezuela international footballers
1993 Copa América players
1995 Copa América players
Trujillanos FC players
Happy Valley AA players
Estudiantes de Mérida players
12 de Octubre Football Club players
Club Olimpia footballers
Caracas FC players
A.C.C.D. Mineros de Guayana players
Venezuelan expatriate footballers
Expatriate footballers in Hong Kong
Expatriate footballers in Paraguay
Association football goalkeepers
Venezuelan expatriate sportspeople in Hong Kong
Venezuelan expatriate sportspeople in Paraguay